Halorubrum vacuolatum is a halophilic archaeon in the family of Halorubraceae. It is an extremophile and is able to survive in water with high salt concentration.

References

Euryarchaeota
Archaea described in 1993